The 1965 NBA draft was the 19th annual draft of the National Basketball Association (NBA). The draft was held on May 6, 1965, before the 1965–66 season.

In this draft, nine NBA teams took turns selecting amateur U.S. college basketball players. A player who had finished his four-year college eligibility was eligible for selection. If a player left college early, he would not be eligible for selection until his college class graduated. Teams that finished last in each division, the San Francisco Warriors and the New York Knicks, were awarded the first four picks in the draft. The remaining first-round picks and the subsequent rounds were assigned to teams in reverse order of their win–loss record in the previous season.

Before the draft, a team could forfeit its first-round draft pick and then select any player from within a 50-mile radius of its home arena as their territorial pick. The draft consisted of 17 rounds comprising 112 players selected. This draft was the last in which the territorial pick rule remained in effect, before it was eliminated prior to the 1966 draft.

Draft selections and draftee career notes
Bill Bradley, Bill Buntin and Gail Goodrich were selected before the draft as New York Knicks', Detroit Pistons' and Los Angeles Lakers' territorial picks respectively. Fred Hetzel from Davidson College was selected first overall by the San Francisco Warriors. Rick Barry from the University of Miami, who went on to win the Rookie of the Year Award in his first season, was drafted second by the Warriors. Four players from this draft, Barry, Bradley, Goodrich and fifth pick Billy Cunningham, have been inducted to the Basketball Hall of Fame. Barry and Cunningham were also named in the 50 Greatest Players in NBA History list announced at the league's 50th anniversary in 1996.

The Los Angeles Lakers had intended on selecting Wayne Estes, a Montana native who played for the Utah State Aggies, in the first round. However, Estes died on February 8, 1965, aged 21, when he was electrocuted by a downed wire at the scene of an auto accident he and teammates were visiting. Less than two hours before dying, Estes completed a game where he scored 48 points; his 47th point of the game was also the 2,000th of his college career.

Barry's achievements include one NBA championship with the Warriors in 1975, one Finals MVP, five All-NBA Team selections and four All-Star Game selections. Cunningham's achievements include an NBA championship with the Philadelphia 76ers in 1967, four All-NBA Team selections and four All-Star Game selections. He also played two seasons in the American Basketball Association (ABA) with the Carolina Cougars. In his first season there, he won the ABA Most Valuable Player Award and was selected to the ABA All-Star Game and All-ABA Team. He later coached the 76ers for eight seasons and won the NBA championship in 1983. Goodrich's achievements include an NBA championship with the Los Angeles Lakers in 1972, one All-NBA Team selection and five All-Star Game selections. Bradley, who spent all of his 10-year playing career with the Knicks, won the NBA championships twice in 1970 and 1973 and was also selected to one All-Star Game. Bradley became a successful politician after retiring from basketball. He was elected as a Democrat to the United States Senate for 18 years. He was also a candidate for the Democratic presidential nomination in 2000, losing to incumbent Vice President Al Gore in the presidential primaries.

Bob Love, the 33rd pick, was selected to two All-NBA Teams and three All-Star Games. Jerry Sloan, the 4th pick, was selected to two All-Star Games during his playing career before becoming a head coach. He coached the Chicago Bulls for three seasons before being fired during the 1981–82 season. He then became the head coach of the Utah Jazz in 1988, the position he held until resigning in early 2011. He has been inducted to the Basketball Hall of Fame as a coach. Twin brothers Dick and Tom Van Arsdale, who were drafted with the 10th and 11th picks, became the first set of twins to play in the NBA. Each of them had three All-Star Game selections. They played for different NBA teams until their last season, which they spent together as a member of the Phoenix Suns. Dick Van Arsdale also had a coaching career. He was the interim head coach of the Suns in 1987. Two other players from this draft, 15th pick Flynn Robinson and 24th pick Jon McGlocklin, have also been selected to an All-Star Game. Bob Weiss, the 22nd pick, also became a head coach after ending his playing career. He coached four NBA teams, most recently with the Seattle SuperSonics. Tal Brody, the 12th pick, never played in the NBA. He joined Israeli club Maccabi Tel Aviv in 1966 and played there until his retirement in 1980, winning several Israeli league titles and a European Cup Championship in 1977. He also became an Israeli citizen and played for Israeli national team. Aside from playing in the NBA, 20th pick Ron Reed also played professional baseball in the Major League Baseball (MLB). He ended his dual-sport career in 1967 to focus on baseball. He played 19 seasons in the MLB with three teams, winning the World Series once. He was also an MLB All-Star. He is one of only 12 athletes who have played in both NBA and MLB.

Key

Draft

Other picks
The following list includes other draft picks who have appeared in at least one NBA game.

Notable undrafted players
These players were not selected in the 1965 draft but played at least one game in the NBA.

Notes

See also
 List of first overall NBA draft picks

References
General

Specific

External links
NBA.com
NBA.com: NBA Draft History

Draft
National Basketball Association draft
NBA draft
NBA draft
Basketball in New York City
Sporting events in New York City